The St. Francis of Assisi Parish Church, commonly known as the General Trias Church, is the first Catholic parish church of the municipality of General Trias in Cavite province in the Philippines. Typical of towns established during the Spanish colonial period, the church is located at the plaza (town square) of General Trias, which was formerly called San Francisco de Malabon in honor of its patron saint, Saint Francis of Assisi.

History
The first church in General Trias was established by the Franciscans when it was still a visita (sub-parish) of Cavite Viejo (now Kawit). It was transferred to the Jesuit order of Cavite Puerto (now Cavite City) in 1624, eventually becoming a separate parish on September 9, 1753.

The first stone church was erected in 1769 under the leadership of Doña Maria Josepha de Yrizzari Y Ursula, Countess of Lizarraga. It was restored and enlarged in 1834. The Luzon earthquakes of 1880 partially damaged the church. As a result, the facade was replaced in 1881 with further restoration in 1885. The roof tiles were replaced in 1892 with the lighter, corrugated galvanised iron roofing as further protection from earthquakes. It was again refurbished and enlarged in 1893.

Between 1989 and 1991, the church was restored to its former appearance. After completion, it was again consecrated on June 22, 1991, by Most Reverend Felix P. Perez of the Diocese of Imus in which it lies.

Convent building

Attached to the church is the convent. It is where the Banda San Francisco de Malabon, a local marching band, practiced the music of the Philippine national anthem Marcha Filipina before performing it during the Philippine Declaration of Independence from Spain on June 12, 1898, in Kawit, Cavite. The convent now houses the Museo de San Francisco de Malabon.

Historical marker
The St. Francis of Assisi Church was declared a historic structure by the National Historical Institute of the Philippines (now National Historical Commission of the Philippines) with the placing of a marker in 1992.

References

Roman Catholic churches in Cavite
Roman Catholic churches completed in 1869
1750s establishments in the Philippines
Churches in the Roman Catholic Diocese of Imus
Marked Historical Structures of the Philippines
Spanish Colonial architecture in the Philippines
Romanesque Revival church buildings in the Philippines
19th-century Roman Catholic church buildings in the Philippines